Gary Hughes is a musician.

Gary Hughes may also refer to:

Gary Hughes (baseball)
Gary Hughes (journalist)
Gary Hughes (soccer)
Gary Hughes (album)

See also
Garry Hughes, rugby league player
Gareth Hughes (disambiguation)